Zhao Nannan (born March 18, 1990, in Changchun, Jilin) is a Chinese female short track speed skater. She competed for China at the 2010 Winter Olympics in the 500 metres.

Achievements
2009-2010 season, ISU Short Track Speed Skating World Cup Finals 500 m bronze medal

References

1990 births
Living people
Chinese female speed skaters
Chinese female short track speed skaters
Olympic short track speed skaters of China
Short track speed skaters at the 2010 Winter Olympics
Asian Games medalists in short track speed skating
Asian Games gold medalists for China
Short track speed skaters at the 2011 Asian Winter Games
Medalists at the 2011 Asian Winter Games
Speed skaters from Changchun
20th-century Chinese women
21st-century Chinese women